Le Jeune Turc (The Young Turk in French) was a French language pro-CUP Zionist newspaper published in the late Ottoman Empire. It was one of two leading Zionist publications in Istanbul. The other one was L'Aurore which was also published in French. However, the circulation of Le Jeune Turc was much higher than that of L'Aurore, 15,000 copies and 1,500 copies, respectively.

References

French-language newspapers published in Ottoman Empire
Newspapers published in Istanbul
1908 establishments in the Ottoman Empire
1918 disestablishments in the Ottoman Empire
Zionism in the Ottoman Empire
Defunct newspapers published in the Ottoman Empire
Newspapers established in 1908
Publications disestablished in 1918
Jews and Judaism in Istanbul